Vijayalakshmi Vadlapati (2 December 1960 – 23 September 1996), better known by her stage name Silk Smitha, was an Indian actress who worked predominantly in various Indian films. She appeared in about 360 films in Tamil, Telugu, Kannada, Hindi and Malayalam languages. In 1983, she made the world record of appearing in most films in a single year.

Filmography

References

Indian filmographies
Actress filmographies